Charles Armitt (10 January 1926  – 17 April 2004) was an English professional rugby league footballer who played in the 1940s and 1950s.

Background
Charlie Armitt's birth was registered in Salford district, England.

Club career
Armitt was transferred from Swinton to Huddersfield in July 1953. A year later he transferred to Blackpool Borough.

Representative honours
Armitt won a cap for England while at Swinton in 1949 against Other Nationalities. He also played for Lancashire.

Genealogical information
Charlie Armitt was the son of the rugby league footballer; Tommy Armitt.

References

1926 births
2004 deaths
Blackpool Borough players
England national rugby league team players
English rugby league players
Huddersfield Giants players
Lancashire rugby league team players
Place of death missing
Rugby league players from Salford
Rugby league second-rows
Swinton Lions players